Scleria terrestris is a species of flowering plant in the family Cyperaceae, the sedges. It is native to much of Asia and Australia, where it is widespread and occasional. It is a rhizomatous perennial herb that grows in wet habitat, such as streambanks and wet mountain understory, and some types of dry and disturbed habitat.

References

terrestris
Plants described in 1753
Taxa named by Carl Linnaeus